The Northwood Timberwolves are the athletic teams that represent Northwood University, located in Midland, Michigan, in intercollegiate sports as a member of the NCAA Division II ranks, primarily competing in the Great Midwest Athletic Conference (G-MAC) since the 2022–23 academic year. The Timberwolves previously competed in the Great Lakes Intercollegiate Athletic Conference (GLIAC) from 1972–73 to 1986–87, and again from 1992–93 to 2021–22.

On April 29, 2021, Northwood announced that it will leave the GLIAC to join the G-MAC in July 2022.

Varsity teams

Northwood competes in 18 varsity sports: Men's sports include baseball, basketball, cross country, football, golf, lacrosse, soccer, tennis, and track & field; while women's sports include basketball, cross country, golf, lacrosse, soccer, softball, tennis, track & field, and volleyball. Club sports include men's ice hockey.

Club teams

Men's Ice Hockey
Northwood University men's ice hockey competes in the American Collegiate Hockey Association (ACHA) and is a member of the Michigan Collegiate Hockey Conference (MCHC).

References

External links